The Kenya Hockey Union (KHU) is the governing body of field hockey in Kenya. Its headquarters are in Nairobi. It is affiliated to IHF International Hockey Federation and AHF African Hockey Federation. The Kenya Hockey Union's main venue is the City Park Hockey Stadium.

See also
Kenya men's national field hockey team
African Hockey Federation

References

External links
Official website 
Kenya-FIH
Hockey Kenya-FB

Kenya
Hockey
Field hockey in Kenya